Eileen Vigor (born 1935) is an English former cricketer and international lawn bowler. She played as a right-arm off break bowler, and played in five test matches for the England women's cricket team between 1963 and 1966. She played domestic cricket for Surrey. Vigor also played for the England bowls team, and took part in the 1991 World Indoor Bowls Championship.

References

External links
 
 

1935 births
Living people
People from Bermondsey
England women Test cricketers
Surrey women cricketers
English female bowls players